is a former Japanese football player and manager. He played for Japan national team.

Club career
Sakakura was educated at and played for Yokkaichi Chuo Technical High School and Juntendo University. After finishing the university, he joined Japan Soccer League side Furuawa Electric (later JEF United Ichihara). He moved to Nagoya Grampus Eight in 1995, then Japan Football League side Brummell Sendai in 1996. He finished his playing career in 1998 at his home town club Mind House TC, a Regional Leagues side, after playing for them for one season.

National team career
Sakakura was capped 6 times without scoring for the Japanese national team between 1990 and 1991. His first full international cap came on July 27, 1990 in a Dynasty Cup match against South Korea in Beijing. He was a member of the Japan team that won the 1992 Asian Cup but did not play in the tournament.

Coaching career
Sakakura was a coach at Yokohama FC between 1999 and 2004. He briefly served as caretaker manager at the club after Yoshikazu Nagai was sacked in 2001. He coached Kyoto Sanga FC's U-18 team from 2005 to 2007. He moved to Tochigi SC and became a coach. In 2014, he became a manager and managed until July 2015. He signed with Shimizu S-Pulse in 2016 and coached until 2017. He moved to AC Nagano Parceiro in 2018 and became a coach. In June, he became a manager as Tetsuya Asano successor. He managed until end of 2018 season.

Club statistics

National team statistics

Managerial statistics

Honors and awards

Team Honors
 1992 Asian Cup (Champions)

References

External links
 
 Japan National Football Team Database
 
 

1967 births
Living people
Juntendo University alumni
Association football people from Mie Prefecture
Japanese footballers
Japan international footballers
Japan Soccer League players
J1 League players
Japan Football League (1992–1998) players
JEF United Chiba players
Nagoya Grampus players
Vegalta Sendai players
1988 AFC Asian Cup players
1992 AFC Asian Cup players
AFC Asian Cup-winning players
Footballers at the 1990 Asian Games
Japanese football managers
J2 League managers
J3 League managers
Yokohama FC managers
Tochigi SC managers
AC Nagano Parceiro managers
Association football defenders
Asian Games competitors for Japan